Cleveland County is a county located in the foothills of the Blue Ridge Mountains and the western Piedmont, on the southern border of the U.S. state of North Carolina. As of the 2020 census, the population was 99,519. Its county seat is Shelby. Cleveland County comprises the Shelby, NC Micropolitan Statistical Area. It is included in the Charlotte-Concord, NC-SC Combined Statistical Area.

History
The county was formed in 1841 from parts of Lincoln and Rutherford counties. It was named for Benjamin Cleveland, a colonel in the American Revolutionary War, who took part in Patriot victory at the Battle of King's Mountain. From 1841 to 1887 "Cleaveland" was the spelling used; the present spelling was adopted in 1887.

Geography

Cleveland County is part of the South Mountains, a sub-range of the Blueridge Mountains that runs through the county's northwest corner. In the south east corner of the county is Crowders & Kings Mountains, part of a small narrow ridge that sits above the very near surrounding area. They are part of a very old remnant of The Appalachians and used to be much larger. Overall Cleveland County is very hilly, and even mountainous in certain parts, though not to the extreme as counties to the west or north.

State and local protected areas 
 Broad River Greenway
 City of Shelby Hanna Park
 Fallen Heroes Memorial at Raper-Roark Park
 John H. Moss Lake Recreation Park
 Kings Mountain Gateway Trail

Major water bodies 
 Benson Creek
 Broad River
 Buffalo Creek
 Hilton Creek
 Kings Mountain Reservoir
 Little Buffalo Creek
 Little Persimmon Creek
 Persimmon Creek
 Suck Creek

Adjacent counties
 Burke County - north
 Lincoln County - east
 Gaston County - east
 York County, South Carolina - south
 Cherokee County, South Carolina - south
 Rutherford County - west

Major highways
 
 
 
  (Kings Mountain)
  (Shelby)
  (To Rutherford County)
  (Shelby Bypass)

Demographics

2020 census

As of the 2020 United States census, there were 99,519 people, 30,599 households, and 21,410 families residing in the county.

2010 census
As of the census of 2010, there were 98,078 people, 37,046 households, and 27,006 families residing in the county.  The population density was 207 people per square mile (80/km2). There were 40,317 housing units at an average density of 87 per square mile (34/km2). The racial makeup of the county was 74% White, 21% Black or African American, 0.15% Native American, 0.69% Asian, 0.01% Pacific Islander, 0.68% from other races, and 0.72% from two or more races. Of any race, 3% of the population were Hispanic or Latino.

There were 37,046 households, out of which 32.20% had children under the age of 18 living with them, 55.00% were married couples living together, 13.70% had a female householder with no husband present, and 27.10% were non-families. 23.60% of all households were made up of individuals, and 9.60% had someone living alone who was 65 years of age or older.  The average household size was 2.53 and the average family size was 2.98.

In the county, the age distribution of the population shows 25.20% under the age of 18, 8.80% from 18 to 24, 28.80% from 25 to 44, 23.70% from 45 to 64, and 13.50% who were 65 years of age or older. The median age was 36 years. For every 100 females there were 92.60 males. For every 100 females age 18 and over, there were 88.60 males.

The median income for a household in the county was $35,283, and the median income for a family was $41,733. Males had a median income of $30,882 versus $21,995 for females. The per capita income for the county was $17,395. About 10.10% of families and 13.30% of the population were below the poverty line, including 17.90% of those under age 18 and 14.00% of those age 65 or over.

Government and politics

Cleveland is a typical "Solid South" county in its voting patterns. It was Democratic until 1968 when a majority voted for George Wallace. In 1972 the county voted overwhelmingly for Richard Nixon, and since then Cleveland has become strongly Republican. The last Democrat to carry Cleveland County was Jimmy Carter in 1980.

Cleveland County is a member of the Isothermal Planning and Development Commission regional council of governments.

Education

Cleveland County Schools
Cleveland County Schools has 29 schools ranging from pre-kindergarten to twelfth grade, comprising five high schools, two alternative schools, four middle schools, two intermediate schools (grades 5 and 6), and sixteen elementary schools. It was formed from the 2004 merger of Kings Mountain City Schools, Shelby City Schools and the former Cleveland County Schools.

Post-secondary
 Ambassador Bible College in Lattimore, North Carolina
 Cleveland Community College
 Gardner–Webb University

Communities

Cities
 Kings Mountain (small section is a part of Gaston County)
 Shelby (county seat and largest city)

Towns

 Belwood
 Boiling Springs
 Casar
 Earl
 Fallston
 Grover
 Kingstown
 Lattimore
 Lawndale
 Mooresboro
 Patterson Springs
 Polkville
 Waco

Census-designated place
 Light Oak

Unincorporated community
 Toluca

Townships
By the requirement of the North Carolina Constitution of 1868, Cleveland County was divided into 11 townships. However, the county later dissolved all townships and is now a single nonfunctioning, nongovernmental county subdivision called Cleveland. The townships that previously existed in the county were:

 Township 1, River
 Township 2, Boiling Springs
 Township 3, Rippys
 Township 4, Kings Mountain
 Township 5, Warlick
 Township 6, Shelby
 Township 7, Sandy Run
 Township 8, Polkville
 Township 9, Double Shoals
 Township 10, Knob Creek
 Township 11, Casar

In popular culture
The 2000 disappearance of Asha Degree, a Shelby girl, was discussed on television shows including America's Most Wanted, The Oprah Winfrey Show, Good Morning America, and The Montel Williams Show.

Parts of the 2012 movie The Hunger Games were filmed in Cleveland County.

Notable people
 Tamara P. Barringer, former state legislator and Associate Justice of the North Carolina Supreme Court
 Bobby Bell, NFL Hall of Fame inductee
 Alicia Bridges, disco singer
 Jonathan Bullard, NFL DE, Minnesota Vikings. Former Crest High School and the University of Florida football great.
 W. J. Cash, author of The Mind of the South
 Bill Champion, MLB player.
 Morris Davis, Colonel in US Air Force
 Thomas Dixon Jr., minister, author
 Manny Fernandez, "The Raging Bull", professional wrestler
 David Flair, professional wrestler
 Alvin Gentry, NBA Coach
 Don Gibson, Country Music Hall of Fame inductee
 Pleasant Daniel Gold, American publisher and Baptist minister
 Kay Hagan, Senator from North Carolina.
 Robert Harrill, The Fort Fisher Hermit
 Keith E. Haynes, Maryland statesman, lawyer
 Norris Hopper, MLB player
 Hatcher Hughes, Pulitzer Prize winner
 Charlie Justice, NFL player, two-time Heisman Trophy runner-up
 Doug Limerick, ABC radio newscaster
 Patty Loveless, country music singer
 Leroy McAfee – Confederate soldier, Ku Klux Klan organizer, and member of the North Carolina House of Representatives (1870–73).
 Manteo Mitchell, Olympic Silver Medalist, World Champion, US Champion, International Icon in Track & Field
 Scottie Montgomery, NFL wide receiver, Oakland Raiders, Arena Football League player
 Tim Moore (North Carolina politician), member of the General Assembly since 2003 and elected Speaker of the North Carolina State House in 2015, has lived in the county since 1997 and has his law practice there.
 Travis Padgett, Olympic athlete in track and field
 Floyd Patterson, heavyweight boxing champion, Boxing Hall Of Fame inductee
 Rodney Allen Rippy, former child actor
 Earl Scruggs, banjo player and composer, included on Hollywood Walk of Fame
 Isaac Shelby, soldier, governor
 Charlotte Smith, WNBA basketball player
 Brandon Spikes, professional football linebacker
 Billy Standridge, NASCAR driver
 Tim Steele, 3-time ARCA champion, NASCAR driver
 David Thompson, Hall of Fame college and professional basketball player
 Cliff Washburn, NFL offensive tackle, Houston Texans
 Tim Wilkison, tennis player
 Tom Wright, MLB player.

See also
 List of counties in North Carolina
 National Register of Historic Places listings in Cleveland County, North Carolina

References

External links

 
 

 
1841 establishments in North Carolina
Populated places established in 1841